The January 2012 Pacific Northwest snowstorm was a large extratropical cyclone that brought record snowfall to the Pacific Northwest in January 2012. A  wind gust was reported at Otter Rock, Oregon. A mother and child were killed in Oregon after the car they were in slid into a creek, while a man was killed in the Seattle area. About 200,000 homes were without power in the Greater Seattle area after the storm.

Meteorological synopsis
By 0200 UTC the next day,  of snow had already fallen in Stanley, Idaho.

Impact

United States
The National Weather Service (NWS) began issuing severe weather warnings for the whole of the Pacific Northwest on January 17 and 18. A hurricane-force wind warning was issued for offshore Oregon at about 1600 UTC on January 18. A storm warning was also issued for parts of California and Oregon. Numerous flights were cancelled due to heavy snow and rain. The NWS office in Missoula, Montana, said that this storm ranked in the top seven of the top snowfall events in the area.

Interstate 5 near Centralia, Washington, was closed temporarily due to powerlines brought down by snowfall; the standard detour route was also blocked by trees and powerlines.
Amtrak service between Portland and Seattle was canceled due to trees and debris left on tracks.
More than 12 Oregon highways were closed due to storm damage, and many more were partly closed.
Oregon Route 213 near Molalla closed for several days due to an undermined roadbed beside a culvert.

Non-winter weather events

Rainfall

A Pineapple Express event brought heavy precipitation to Western Oregon, generally more so than to western Washington, with most precipitation in the form of rain instead of snow. Eugene broke its precipitation record for January 18, and Salem came within  of breaking its record for January 19. The weather was attributed to La Niña.

See also

2006 Central Pacific cyclone
Great Gale of 1880
Columbus Day Storm of 1962
South Valley Surprise of 2002
Hanukkah Eve windstorm of 2006
Great Coastal Gale of 2007

References

External links

2012 in Oregon
2012 in Washington (state)
2012 meteorology
2012 natural disasters in the United States
Natural disasters in Oregon
Natural disasters in Washington (state)
Pacific Northwest storms
January 2012 events in North America